Raindrop cake is a dessert made of water and agar that is supposed to resemble a raindrop. It first became popular in Japan in 2014, and later gained international attention.

History
Originally a Japanese dessert known as mizu shingen mochi (水信玄餅), the dish is as an evolution of the traditional Japanese dessert shingen mochi (信玄餅). Shingen mochi was first created the Sengoku era by the daimyo, Takeda Shingen, as an emergency food made from rice flour and sugar.

Mizu Shingen Mochi 
In modern Japan, locals in Hokuto-cho began incorporating fresh mineral water into the dessert. The Kinseiken Seika Company in Yamanashi Prefecture was one of the first stores to sell this during the weekends.

Mizu means water and shingen mochi is a type of sweet rice cake (mochi) made by the Kinseiken company. The year prior in 2013, the creator wanted to explore the idea of making edible water. The dessert became a viral sensation and people made special trips to experience the dish.

Darren Wong introduced the dish to the United States in New York City at the April 2016 Smorgasburg food fair.  Shortly after, London restaurant Yamagoya worked four months to develop another version.

Description
The dish is made from mineral water and agar; thus, it has virtually no calories. The water from the original dish was obtained from Mount Kaikoma of the Southern Japanese Alps, and it has been described as having a mildly sweet taste. Agar is a vegan alternative to gelatin that is made from seaweed. After being heated, it is molded and cooled. A molasses-like syrup, called kuromitsu, and soybean flour, called kinako, are used as toppings. The dish appears like a transparent raindrop, although it has also been compared to breast implants and jellyfish. The largely tasteless dessert melts when it enters the mouth and must be eaten immediately, or it will melt and begin to evaporate after twenty minutes.

The dessert is also sold in kits to be made at home. It has been showcased by mainstream American media on The Today Show, BuzzFeed and ABC News.

See also
Japanese cuisine
 List of Japanese desserts and sweets

References

External links
 

Japanese desserts and sweets